Dillon Jeffrey Radunz (born March 28, 1998) is an American football guard for the Tennessee Titans of the National Football League (NFL). He played college football at North Dakota State and was drafted by the Titans in the second round in the 2021 NFL Draft.

Early life and high school career
Radunz grew up mostly in Becker, Minnesota, after his family moved there when he was in first grade. He attended Becker High School, where he played basketball, football, and was a shot putter on the track and field team. He was a two year starter at both offensive tackle and defensive end for Becker as the team went 25–1 and won back-to-back state championships. As a senior Radunz, was named the All-Area Football Player of the Year by the St. Cloud Times, East Central District North Division Most Valuable Player, and first-team All-State. He finished his high school career with 163 tackles, including 14 sacks. Radunz committed to play college football at North Dakota State.

College career
Radunz redshirted as a true freshman. He was named a starter going into his freshman season, but suffered a season ending knee injury after playing 17 snaps in the season opener. He was named second-team All-Missouri Valley Football Conference (MVFC) and started 15 games as a redshirt sophomore. As a junior he played 682 snaps with 63 knockdowns and zero sacks allowed in 12 regular season games and started all 16 of the Bison's games and was named first-team All-MVFC and was a consensus first-team All-American selection. Radunz entered his redshirt senior season as a consensus preseason All-American. He started the only game of North Dakota State's fall season against Central Arkansas, as the MVFC postponed its season due to the COVID-19 pandemic. Radunz attended and played in the 2021 Senior Bowl.

Professional career

Radunz was drafted by the Tennessee Titans in the second round, 53rd overall, in the 2021 NFL Draft. On May 13, Radunz signed his four-year rookie contract with Tennessee. He made his first career start at left tackle in Week 16 in place of an injured Taylor Lewan.

Radunz entered the 2022 season as a backup guard behind Aaron Brewer and Nate Davis. He made four total starts at both guard spots due to injuries. He was placed on injured reserve on December 22, 2022.

References

External links
Tennessee Titans bio
North Dakota State Bison bio

1998 births
Living people
People from Becker, Minnesota
Players of American football from Minnesota
Sportspeople from the Minneapolis–Saint Paul metropolitan area
American football offensive tackles
North Dakota State Bison football players
Tennessee Titans players